Podporuchik is the most Junior officer in some Slavic armed forces, and is placed below the rank of Lieutenant, typically corresponding to rank of second lieutenant in anglophone countries.

Russia and Russian imperial armed forces 
The rank was introduced first by Peter the Great in 1703 as an officer rank of the so-called ober-officer rank group. It belonged to rank class XIII (infantry), class XII (artillery, and engineer troops), and class X (guards) until 1884. In line with the military reforms in 1884,  became in peace time. However, in the guards and the cossacks armed forces Cornet and Chorąży remained the lowest officer rank.

Poland
It is roughly equivalent to the military rank of the Second lieutenant in the armed forces of English-speaking countries.

The rank may also awarded by the way of a promotion provided certain conditions.

The rank of  also exists in the Border Guard, the State Protection Service, Foreign Intelligence Agency, the Military Counterintelligence Service, the Internal Security Agency, and in the Polish Navy.

Variants
 Prison Service: 
 Navy: 

Possible rank sequence
A possible sequence of ranks (ascending) might be as follows:
 Podporuchik (sub / junior poruchik / lieutenant)
 Poruchik (lieutenant)
 Nadporuchik (senior poruchik / lieutenant)
 Kapitan (captain)

Podporuchik insignia

Army

Navy

See also 
 Lieutenant (Eastern Europe)
 Lieutenant colonel (Eastern Europe)
 Colonel (Eastern Europe)
 Lieutenant colonel general
 Comparative army officer ranks of Europe
 Ranks and insignia of the Russian armed forces until 1917

References

Further reading
 Przepis Ubioru Polowego Wojsk Polskich. Warszawa: Zakłady Graficzno-Wydawnicze "Książka", 1919.
 Przepisy ubiorcze żołnierzy Wojska Polskiego; sygn. Mund. 45/71/III. Warszawa: Wydawnictwo Ministerstwa Obrony Narodowej, 1972.

Military ranks of Russia
Military ranks of the Soviet Union